The Kuril Islands or Kurile Islands (Japanese:  or ) are a volcanic archipelago administered as part of Sakhalin Oblast in the Russian Far East. There are 56 islands and many minor islets. The Kuril Islands consist of the Greater Kuril Chain and, at the southwest end, the parallel Lesser Kuril Chain.

The islands have been under Russian administration since their 1945 invasion by the Soviet Union near the end of World War II. Japan claims the four southernmost islands, including two of the three largest  (Iturup and Kunashir), as part of its territory, as well as Shikotan and the Habomai islets, which has led to the ongoing Kuril Islands dispute. The disputed islands are known in Japan as the country's "Northern Territories".

Etymology
The name Kuril originates from the autonym of the aboriginal Ainu, the islands' original inhabitants: kur, meaning 'man'. It may also be related to names for other islands that have traditionally been inhabited by the Ainu people, such as Kuyi or Kuye for Sakhalin and Kai for Hokkaidō. In Japanese, the Kuril Islands are known as the Chishima Islands (Kanji:   , literally, 'Thousand Islands Archipelago'), also known as the Kuriru Islands (Katakana:   , literally, Kuril Archipelago). Once the Russians reached the islands in the 18th century they found a pseudo-etymology from Russian kurit′, курить 'to smoke' due to the continual fumes and steam above the islands from volcanoes.

Geography and climate

The Kuril Islands form part of the ring of tectonic instability encircling the Pacific Ocean referred to as the Ring of Fire. The chain has around 100 volcanoes, some 40 of which are active, and many hot springs and fumaroles. There is frequent seismic activity, including a magnitude 8.5 earthquake in 1963 and one of magnitude 8.3 recorded on November 15, 2006, which resulted in tsunami waves up to  reaching the California coast. Raikoke Island, near the centre of the archipelago, has an active volcano which erupted again in June 2019, with emissions reaching .

The climate on the islands is generally severe, with long, cold, stormy winters and short and notoriously foggy summers. The Köppen climate classification of most of the Kurils is subarctic (Dfc), although Kunashir is humid continental (Dfb). However, the Kuril Islands’ climate resembles the subpolar oceanic climate of southwest Alaska much more than the hypercontinental climate of Manchuria and interior Siberia, as precipitation is heavy and permafrost completely absent. It is characterized by mild summers with only 1 to 3 months above  and cold, snowy, extremely windy winters below , although usually above .

The chain ranges from temperate to sub-Arctic climate types, and the vegetative cover consequently ranges from tundra in the north to dense spruce and larch forests on the larger southern islands. The highest elevations on the islands are Alaid volcano on Atlasov Island at the northern end of the chain and Tyatya volcano on Kunashir Island at the southern end.

Landscape types and habitats on the islands include many kinds of beach and rocky shores, cliffs, wide rivers and fast gravelly streams, forests, grasslands, alpine tundra, crater lakes and peat bogs. The soils are generally productive, owing to the periodic influxes of volcanic ash and, in certain places, owing to significant enrichment by seabird guano. However, many of the steep, unconsolidated slopes are susceptible to landslides and newer volcanic activity can entirely denude a landscape. Only the southernmost island has large areas covered by trees, while more northerly islands have no trees, or spotty tree cover.

The northernmost, Atlasov Island (Oyakoba in Japanese), is an almost-perfect volcanic cone rising sheer out of the sea; it has been praised by the Japanese in haiku, wood-block prints, and other forms, in much the same way as the better-known Mount Fuji. Its summit is the highest point in Sakhalin Oblast.

Ecology

Marine
Owing to their location along the Pacific shelf edge and the confluence of Okhotsk Sea gyre and the southward Oyashio Current, the Kuril islands are surrounded by waters that are among the most productive in the North Pacific, supporting a wide range and high abundance of marine life.

Invertebrates: Extensive kelp beds surrounding almost every island provide crucial habitat for sea urchins, various mollusks and countless other invertebrates and their associated predators. Many species of squid provide a principal component of the diet of many of the smaller marine mammals and birds along the chain.

Fish: Further offshore, walleye pollock, Pacific cod, several species of flatfish are of the greatest commercial importance. During the 1980s, migratory Japanese sardine was one of the most abundant fish in the summer.

Pinniped: The main pinnipeds were a significant object of harvest for the indigenous populations of the Kuril islands, both for food and materials such as skin and bone. The long-term fluctuations in the range and distribution of human settlements along the Kuril island presumably tracked the pinniped ranges. In historical times, fur seals were heavily exploited for their fur in the 19th and early 20th centuries and several of the largest reproductive rookeries, as on Raykoke island, were extirpated. In contrast, commercial harvest of the true seals and Steller sea lions has been relatively insignificant on the Kuril islands proper. Since the 1960s there has been essentially no additional harvest and the pinniped populations in the Kuril islands appear to be fairly healthy and in some cases expanding. The notable exception is the now extinct Japanese sea lion, which was known to occasionally haul out on the Kuril islands.

Sea otters: Sea otters were exploited very heavily for their pelts in the 19th century, as shown by 19th- and 20th-century whaling catch and sighting records.

Seabirds: The Kuril islands are home to many millions of seabirds, including northern fulmars, tufted puffins, murres, kittiwakes, guillemots, auklets, petrels, gulls and cormorants. On many of the smaller islands in summer, where terrestrial predators are absent, virtually every possibly hummock, cliff niche or underneath of boulder is occupied by a nesting bird. Several of the islands, including Kunashir and the Lesser Kuril Chain in the South Kurils, and the northern Kurils from Urup to Paramushir, have been recognised as Important Bird Areas (IBAs) by BirdLife International because they support populations of various threatened bird species, including many waterbirds, seabirds and waders.

Terrestrial
The composition of terrestrial species on the Kuril islands is dominated by Asian mainland taxa via migration from Hokkaido and Sakhalin Islands and by Kamchatkan taxa from the North. While highly diverse, there is a relatively low level of endemism on a species level.

The WWF divides the Kuril Islands into two ecoregions. The southern Kurils, along with southwestern Sakhalin, comprise the South Sakhalin-Kurile mixed forests ecoregion. The northern islands are part of the Kamchatka-Kurile meadows and sparse forests, a larger ecoregion that extends onto the Kamchatka Peninsula and Commander Islands.

Because of the generally smaller size and isolation of the central islands, few major terrestrial mammals have colonized these, though red and Arctic foxes were introduced for the sake of the fur trade in the 1880s. The bulk of the terrestrial mammal biomass is taken up by rodents, many introduced in historical times. The largest southernmost and northernmost islands are inhabited by brown bear, foxes, and martens. Leopards once inhabited the islands. Some species of deer are found on the more southerly islands. It is claimed that a wild cat, the Kurilian Bobtail, originates from the Kuril Islands. The bobtail is due to the mutation of a dominant gene. The cat has been domesticated and exported to nearby Russia and bred there, becoming a popular domestic cat.

Among terrestrial birds, ravens, peregrine falcons, some wrens and wagtails are common.

History

Early history 

The Ainu people inhabited the Kuril Islands from early times, although few records predate the 17th century. From the Kamakura period to the Muromachi period, there were Ezo (Ainu) people called Hinomoto from the Pacific coast of Hokkaido to the Kuril region, and Mr. Ando, the Ezo Sateshiku and Ezo Kanrei, was in charge of this ("Suwa Daimyojin Ekotoba"). It is said that when turmoil broke out on Ezogashima, he dispatched troops from Tsugaru. Its activities include the Kanto Gomensen, which calls itself the Ando Suigun, and is based in Jusanminato ("Kaisen Shikimoku"), supplying Japanese products to Ezo society and purchasing large quantities of northern products and shipping them nationwide. ("Thirteen Streets").The Matsumae clan, a feudal lord of Japan, became independent from the Ando clan (the family of Goro Ando). The Japanese administration first took nominal control of the islands during the Edo period (1603-1868) in the form of claims by the Matsumae clan.  The Shōhō Era Map of Japan, a map of Japan made by the Tokugawa shogunate in 1644, shows 39 large and small islands northeast of Hokkaido's Shiretoko Peninsula and Cape Nosappu. A Dutch expedition under Maarten Gerritsz Vries explored the islands in 1643. Russian popular legend has Fedot Alekseyevich Popov sailing into the area .
Russian Cossacks landed on Shumshu in 1711.

American whaleships caught right whales off the islands between 1847 and 1892. Three of the ships were wrecked on the islands: two on Urup in 1855 and one on Makanrushi in 1856. In September 1892, north of  Kunashir Island, a Russian schooner seized the bark Cape Horn Pigeon, of New Bedford and escorted it to Vladivostok, where it was detained for nearly two weeks.

Japanese administration 

At the very end of the 19th century, the Japanese administration started the forced assimilation of the native Ainu people. Also at this time the Ainu were granted automatic Japanese citizenship, effectively denying them the status of an indigenous group. Many Japanese moved onto former Ainu lands, including the Kuril islands. The Ainu were required to adopt Japanese names, and ordered to cease religious practices such as animal sacrifice and the custom of tattooing. Although not compulsory education, education was conducted in Japanese. Prior to Japanese colonization (in 1868) about 100 Ainu reportedly lived on the Kuril islands.

World War II 

 In 1941 Admiral Isoroku Yamamoto ordered the assembly of the Imperial Japanese Navy strike-force for the Hawaii Operation attack on Pearl Harbor in Tankan or Hitokappu Bay, Iturup Island, South Kurils. The territory was chosen for its sparse population, lack of foreigners, and constant fog-coverage. The Admiral ordered the move to Hawaii on the morning of 26 November.
 On 10 July 1943 the first bombardment against the Japanese bases in Shumshu and Paramushir by American forces occurred. From Alexai airfield 8 B-25 Mitchells from the 77th Bombardment Squadron took off, led by Capt James L. Hudelson. This mission principally struck Paramushir.
 Another mission was flown during 11 September 1943 when the Eleventh Air Force dispatched eight B-24 Liberators and 12 B-25s. Facing reinforced Japanese defenses, 74 crew members in three B-24s and seven B-25 failed to return. 22 men were killed in action, one taken prisoner and 51 interned in Kamchatka.
 The Eleventh Air Force implemented other bombing missions against the northern Kurils, including a strike by six B-24s from the 404th Bombardment Squadron and 16 P-38s from the 54th Fighter Squadron on 5 February 1944.
 Japanese sources report that the Matsuwa military installations were subject to American air-strikes between 1943 and 1944.
 The Americans' strategic feint called "Operation Wedlock" diverted Japanese attention north and misled them about the U.S. strategy in the Pacific. The plan included air strikes by the USAAF and U.S. Navy bombers which included U.S. Navy shore bombardment and submarine operations. The Japanese increased their garrison in the north Kurils from 8,000 in 1943 to 41,000 in 1944 and maintained more than 400 aircraft in the Kurils and Hokkaidō area in anticipation that the Americans might invade from Alaska.

 American planners had briefly contemplated an invasion of northern Japan from the Aleutian Islands during the autumn of 1943 but rejected that idea as too risky and impractical. They considered the use of Boeing B-29 Superfortresses, on Amchitka and Shemya bases, but rejected the idea. The U.S. military maintained interest in these plans when they ordered the expansion of bases in the western Aleutians, and major construction began on Shemya. In 1945, plans for a possible invasion of Japan via the northern route were shelved.
 Between 18 August and 31 August 1945 Soviet forces invaded the North and South Kurils. 
 The Soviets expelled the entire Japanese civilian population of roughly 17,000 by 1946.
 Between 24 August and 4 September 1945 the Eleventh Air Force of the United States Army Air Forces sent two B-24s on reconnaissance missions over the North Kuril Islands with the intention of taking photos of the Soviet occupation in the area. Soviet fighters intercepted and forced them away.

In February 1945 the Yalta Agreement promised to the Soviet Union South Sakhalin and the Kuril islands in return for entering the Pacific War against the Japanese during World War II. In August 1945 the Soviet Union mounted an armed invasion of South Sakhalin at the cost of over 5,000 Soviet and Japanese lives.

Russian administration

The Kuril Islands are split into three administrative districts (raions), each a part of Sakhalin Oblast:
 Severo-Kurilsky District (Severo-Kurilsk)
 Kurilsky District (Kurilsk)
 Yuzhno-Kurilsky District (Yuzhno-Kurilsk)

Japan maintains a claim to the four southernmost islands of Kunashir, Iturup, Shikotan, and the Habomai rocks, together called the Northern Territories.
In addition, the Japanese government claims that the Kuril Islands other than the Northern Territories and South Karafuto, are undetermined areas under international law because the San Francisco Peace Treaty does not specify where they belong and the Soviet Union has not signed it.

On 8 February 2017 the Russian government gave names to five previously unnamed Kuril islands in Sakhalin Oblast: Derevyanko Island (after Kuzma Derevyanko), Gnechko Island (after Alexey Gnechko), Gromyko Island (after Andrei Gromyko), Farkhutdinov Island (after Igor Farkhutdinov) and Shchetinina Island (after Anna Shchetinina).

Demographics 

, 19,434 people inhabited the Kuril Islands, of which over 16,700 live on the four disputed islands. These include ethnic Russians, Ukrainians, Belarusians, Tatars, Nivkhs, Oroch, and Ainus. Russian Orthodox Christianity is the main religion. Some of the villages are permanently manned by Russian soldiers. Others are inhabited by civilians, who are mostly fishers, workers in fish factories, dockers, and social sphere workers (police, medics, teachers, etc.). Construction works on the islands have attracted migrant workers from the rest of Russia and other post-Soviet states. , there were only 8 inhabited islands out of a total of 56. Iturup Island is over 60% ethnically Ukrainian.

Economy
Fishing is the primary occupation. The islands have strategic and economic value, in terms of fisheries and also mineral deposits of pyrite, sulfur, and various polymetallic ores. There are hopes that oil exploration will provide an economic boost to the islands.

In 2014, construction workers built a pier and a breakwater in Kitovy Bay, central Iturup, where barges are a major means of transport, sailing between the cove and ships anchored offshore. A new road has been carved through the woods near Kurilsk, the island's biggest village, going to the site of Yuzhno-Kurilsk Mendeleyevo Airport.

Gidrostroy, the Kurils' biggest business group with interests in fishing, construction and real estate, built its second fish processing factory on Iturup island in 2006, introducing a state-of-the-art conveyor system.

To deal with a rise in the demand of electricity, the local government is also upgrading a state-run geothermal power plant at Mount Baransky, an active volcano, where steam and hot water can be found.

Military 
The main Russian force stationed on the islands is the 18th Machine Gun Artillery Division, which has its headquarters in Goryachiye Klyuchi on the Iturup Island. There are also Border Guard Service troops stationed on the islands. In February 2011, Russian President Dmitry Medvedev called for substantial reinforcements of the Kuril Islands defences. Subsequently, in 2015, additional anti-aircraft missile systems Tor and Buk, coastal defence missile system Bastion, Kamov Ka-52 combat helicopters and one Varshavyanka project submarine came on defence of Kuril Islands. During the 2022 Russian Invasion of Ukraine it was reported that parts of the 18th Machine Gun Artillery Division were redeployed to Eastern Ukraine.

List of main islands 

While in Russian sources the islands are mentioned for the first time in 1646, the earliest detailed information about them was provided by the explorer Vladimir Atlasov in 1697. In the 18th and early 19th centuries, the Kuril Islands were explored by Danila Antsiferov, I. Kozyrevsky, Ivan Yevreinov, Fyodor Luzhin, Martin Spanberg, Adam Johann von Krusenstern, Vasily Golovnin, and Henry James Snow.

The following table lists information on the main islands from north to south:

See also 

 2006 Kuril Islands earthquake
 2007 Kuril Islands earthquake
 Chishima Province
 Evacuation of Karafuto and Kuriles
 Invasion of the Kuril Islands
 Karafuto Fortress
 Karafuto Prefecture
 Organization of Hokkai (North) Army
 Organization of Kita and Minami Fortresses
 Political divisions of Karafuto Prefecture
 Zemlyak

References

Further reading 

 Gorshkov, G. S. Volcanism and the Upper Mantle Investigations in the Kurile Island Arc. Monographs in geoscience. New York: Plenum Press, 1970. 
 Krasheninnikov, Stepan Petrovich, and James Greive. The History of Kamtschatka and the Kurilski Islands, with the Countries Adjacent. Chicago: Quadrangle Books, 1963.
 Rees, David. The Soviet Seizure of the Kuriles. New York: Praeger, 1985. 
 Takahashi, Hideki, and Masahiro Ōhara. Biodiversity and Biogeography of the Kuril Islands and Sakhalin. Bulletin of the Hokkaido University Museum, no. 2-. Sapporo, Japan: Hokkaido University Museum, 2004.
 Hasegawa, Tsuyoshi. Racing the Enemy: Stalin, Truman, and the Surrender of Japan. 2006. .
 Alan Catharine and Denis Cleary. Unwelcome Company. A fiction thriller novel set in 1984 Tokyo and the Kuriles featuring a light aircraft crash and escape from Russian-held territory. On Kindle.

External links

 Southern Kuriles / Northern Territories: A Stumbling-block in Russia-Japan Relationship, history and analysis by Andrew Andersen, Department of Political Science, University of Victoria, May 2001
 http://depts.washington.edu/ikip/index.shtml (Kuril Island Biocomplexity Project)
  (includes space imagery)
 Kuril Islands at Natural Heritage Protection Fund
 The International Kuril Island Project
 http://www.mofa.go.jp/region/europe/russia/territory/index.html
 Chishima: Frontiers of San Francisco Treaty in Hokkaido Short film on the disputed islands from a Japanese perspective
 USGS Map showing location of Magnitude 8.3 Earthquake 46.616°N, 153.224°E Kuril Islands region, November 15, 2006 11:14:16 UTC
 Pictures of Cats – Kurilian Bobtail
 Pictures of Kuril Islands
 Kuril Islands at Encyclopædia Britannica

 
Archipelagoes of the Pacific Ocean
Islands of the Sea of Okhotsk
Islands of the Russian Far East
Archipelagoes of Japan
Geography of Northeast Asia
Archipelagoes of Sakhalin Oblast
Disputed islands
Disputed territories in Asia
Pacific Coast of Russia
Landforms of the Sea of Okhotsk
Volcanoes of Sakhalin Oblast
Stratovolcanoes of Russia
Former Japanese colonies
Shipwrecks in the Sea of Okhotsk
Important Bird Areas of the Kurile Islands
Seabird colonies